Soundwave tattoos are tattoo designs created from audio clips. The tattoos can be scanned and played back via a smartphone app which translates the tattoo's wavelengths into sound. The process was pioneered by an augumented reality app Skin Motion developed by Nate Siggard in 2017.

Process 

 A 5 to 30 second sound is recorded which could be a message or any sound at all. 
 A sound wave is created out of it using various software and printed on paper.
 The print is inked it on the client's body line by line. 
 After inking, the picture of the sound wave is uploaded to the internet.
 People can use a sound wave app to scan and hear the audio message in it.

Uses 
People have used sound wave tattoos to preserve the voices of their loved ones (deceased and alive) or pets.

References 

Tattooing